Nada (known as The Nada Gang in the USA.) is a Franco-Italian political thriller film directed by Claude Chabrol released in 1974 and adapted from the crime novel Nada by Jean-Patrick Manchette. Inspired by the May 1968 events in France, the film has been described as a social thriller.

Synopsis 
The anarchist group "Nada" kidnaps the United States Ambassador to France in a brothel. During the operation, a police officer is killed and commissaire Goemond is given a free hand to do everything to resolve this affair…

Crew 
Source: IMDb
 Director :  Claude Chabrol
 Screenplay : Claude Chabrol from the novel Nada by Jean-Patrick Manchette
 Script : Claude Chabrol
 Director of photography : Jean Rabier
 Sound : Guy Chichignoud
 Music : Pierre Jansen
 Scenery : Guy Littaye
 Assistant-director : Régis Wargnier
 Editor : Jacques Gaillard
 Script : Aurore Paquiss
 Production : Les Films de La Boétie, Italian International Film (Rome)
 Producer : André Génovès
 Distributor : Les Films de La Boétie, CIC - Cinema International Corporation
 Length : 110 minutes

Cast 
 Fabio Testi (Diaz)
 Maurice Garrel (Epaulard)
 Mariangela Melato (Cash)
 Michel Duchaussoy (Treuffais)
 Michel Aumont (Goemond)
 Didier Kaminka (Meyer)
 Lou Castel (D'Arey)
 Katia Romanoff (Anna Meyer)
 André Falcon (the Minister)
 Lyle Joyce (Ambassador Poindexter)
 Viviane Romance (Mme Gabrielle)
 Daniel Lecourtois (The Préfet)
 Rudy Lenoir (M. Bouillon)
 François Perrot

References

External links 
 
 Nada at Ciné-Ressources

1974 films
1970s thriller films
French political thriller films
Italian political thriller films
1970s political thriller films
Films about terrorism in Europe
1970s French-language films
Films based on French novels
Films based on thriller novels
Films directed by Claude Chabrol
1970s French films
1970s Italian films